Angiola Guglielma Butteri, also known as Angelica Bottero, was a 17th-century Italian artist and nun. She died 26 July 1676 at 80 years old. 

She entered the convent of Sant’Orsola in Casale, then capital of Monferrato, where she was instructed by Sister Francesca Caccia, daughter of the artist Moncalvo, or by Francesca’s sister Orsola Maddalena Caccia. Among her paintings is a representation of Saints Catherine, Agatha, and Apollonia, which is (or was) in the city’s cathedral.

Recently many works signed "C." were attributed to Angiola Guglielma Butteri.

References

People from Casale Monferrato
Italian Baroque painters
17th-century Italian Roman Catholic religious sisters and nuns
Italian women painters
1676 deaths
Year of birth unknown
Nuns and art